Sina Herrmann (born 24 October 2001 in Karlsruhe) is a German tennis player.
 
Herrmann made her WTA Tour main-draw debut at the 2021 Hamburg European Open, in the doubles competition where she and partner Lisa Matviyenko lost to Astra Sharma and Rosalie van der Hoek.

References

External links
 
 

2001 births
Living people
German female tennis players
Sportspeople from Karlsruhe
Tennis people from Baden-Württemberg